Euphaedra olivacea is a butterfly in the family Nymphalidae. It is found in central and western Uganda.

It is a member of the Euphaedra preussi species group q.v.

References

Butterflies described in 1908
olivacea
Endemic fauna of Uganda
Taxa named by Karl Grünberg
Butterflies of Africa